Sangatte is a commune in the Pas-de-Calais department on the northern coast of France on the English Channel. The name is of Flemish origin, meaning hole or gap in the sand.

Engineering
Sangatte is the location for the Channel Tunnel's French cooling station, its British counterpart being at Samphire Hoe. In addition, it is the French end-point for the HVDC Cross-Channel, the connection between the UK and French electricity grids.

History

First underwater telegraph
Sangatte was the landing point of the world's first operational underwater telegraph cable, laid across the Channel by the Submarine Telegraph Company in 1851 between South Foreland and Sangatte.

Pioneering cross-Channel flight
'Blériot-Plage' is named to commemorate Louis Blériot who, on the July 25, 1909, was the first person to fly across the English Channel. He flew from the beach at Sangatte to the White Cliffs of Dover, to claim the prize offered by the Daily Mail. The crossing took 37 minutes in his aeroplane, Blériot XI, built in collaboration with Raymond Saulnier. It was powered by a 3-cylinder  engine.

At the western end of the beach, a statue of the French aviator Hubert Latham overlooks the sea. Latham was another pioneering cross-channel pilot whose earlier attempt on July 19 had failed.

Spitfire
Sangatte is also the landing location of Supermarine Spitfire Mark 1a N3200 of No. 19 Squadron RAF, which was forced to land at the beach after receiving damage to its radiator from shots fired by a Messerschmitt Bf 109 of JG 2 during Operation Dynamo on 26 May 1940, having shot down a Junkers Ju 87 shortly beforehand to protect the evacuating soldiers at Dunkirk. The plane was recovered from the sand at Sangatte in 1986, and restoration work commenced in 2000, which continued until 2014 when works completed, the aircraft having been repaired to a fully airworthy state.

Refugee camp
Sangatte was the location of a refugee camp set up by the French Red Cross in 1999 as a result of an influx of migrants attempting to travel to the United Kingdom. They were mainly from Afghanistan, Iraq and Kosovo. Under pressure from the UK government, Nicolas Sarkozy (then Minister of the Interior), ordered its closure in 2002.  There were riots in 2001 and 2002, the year the camp closed.

Population

Twin towns

 Sandgate, Kent, England, UK.

In popular culture

In the BBC Two show Top Gear, the three presenters Jeremy Clarkson, Richard Hammond and James May crossed the Channel in an amphibious Nissan Navara and instead of finishing at Calais after leaving Dover, they ended up  along the coast in Sangatte.

Personalities 

 The airmen Hubert Latham and Louis Blériot.
 Fabrice Bourré (born in 1962), French footballer, was born in Blériot-Plage.

See also
 Chinese Labour Corps
 Communes of the Pas-de-Calais département

References

External links

(In French language)

Sangatte sur le site de la Côte d'Opale

Communes of Pas-de-Calais
Calais migrant crisis (1999–present)
Pale of Calais
Populated coastal places in France